Hemiculter elongatus is a tropical freshwater fish belonging to the Cultrinae subfamily of the family Cyprinidae.  It is known only from the Ky Cùng River in Lang Son Province, northern Vietnam.  It was originally described by Nguyen & Ngo in 2001.

References

 

Hemiculter
Fish described in 2001